is a Japanese footballer. He currently plays for YSCC Yokohama.

Career
On 14 January 2023, Kojima announcement officially transfer to J3 club, YSCC Yokohama for ahead of 2023 season.

National team career
In October 2009, Kojima was elected Japan U-17 national team for 2009 U-17 World Cup. He played all 3 matches and scored a goal against Switzerland.

Club statistics
Updated to the start from 2023 season.

National team statistics

References

External links
Profile at JEF United Chiba

Shuto Kojima – Urawa Red Diamonds official site 

1992 births
Living people
Association football people from Tochigi Prefecture
Japanese footballers
Japan youth international footballers
J1 League players
J2 League players
J3 League players
Urawa Red Diamonds players
Tokushima Vortis players
Ehime FC players
JEF United Chiba players
YSCC Yokohama players
Association football midfielders